Tony Barton may refer to:

 Tony Barton (footballer) (1937–1993), English footballer and football manager
 Tony Barton (athlete) (born 1969), American high jumper
 Tony Barton (politician) (born 1961), American politician